Hasasaneh-ye Pain (also Romanized as Ḩasāsaneh-ye Pā’īn) is a village in Bani Saleh Rural District, Neysan District, Hoveyzeh County, Khuzestan Province, Iran. At the 2006 census, its population was 210, in 30 families.

References 

Populated places in Hoveyzeh County